The 1953–54 Scottish Cup was the 69th staging of Scotland's most prestigious football knockout competition. The Cup was won by Celtic who defeated Aberdeen in the final.

First round

Replays

Second replays

Second round

Replays

Third round

Replays

Second replays

Quarter-finals

Replays

Semi-finals

Replays

Final

Teams

See also 
 1953–54 in Scottish football
 1953–54 Scottish League Cup

References

External links
 Video highlights from official Pathé News archive

Scottish Cup seasons
1953–54 in Scottish football
Scot